This is a list of protoplanetary nebulae. These objects represent the final stage before a planetary nebula. During this stage, the red giant star begins to slowly expel its outermost layers of material. A protoplanetary nebula usually glows with the light from its parent star. This stage is usually brief, typically lasting no more than a few thousand years.

List

See also
 Lists of astronomical objects

Protoplanetary nebulae